Luís Miguel Vieira Silva (born 8 October 1990), known as Vieira, is a Portuguese professional footballer who plays as a central defender.

Club career
Born in Amarante, Porto District, Vieira played lower league or amateur football until the age of 23. In the summer of 2013 he signed with Segunda Liga club C.D. Aves, making his professional debut on 18 August in a 1–1 away draw against U.D. Oliveirense where he played the full 90 minutes. In his second season, he scored a career-best four goals (in 40 matches) to help his team to the 18th position, still above the relegation zone.

In June 2015, Vieira moved to the Primeira Liga after signing a two-year contract with F.C. Paços de Ferreira. His maiden appearance in the competition took place on 30 August of that year, when he came on as a 42nd-minute substitute in a 1–1 home draw with F.C. Arouca.

Vieira scored four times again in the 2017–18 campaign. One of those goals came on 11 March 2018 as the hosts defeated eventual champions FC Porto 1–0, being nonetheless relegated as second-bottom.

On 17 July 2018, Vieira moved abroad for the first time in his career after agreeing to a three-year deal with Segunda División side CD Lugo. On 30 July of the following year, however, he was transferred to İstanbul Başakşehir F.K. of the Turkish Süper Lig.

Vieira spent the next two seasons on loan, first with Wolfsberger AC in the Austrian Football Bundesliga then Waasland-Beveren in the Belgian First Division A. In February 2022, after only six competitive appearances at the Başakşehir Fatih Terim Stadium, the 31-year-old left by mutual consent.

References

External links

Portuguese League profile 

1990 births
Living people
People from Amarante, Portugal
Sportspeople from Porto District
Portuguese footballers
Association football defenders
Primeira Liga players
Liga Portugal 2 players
Segunda Divisão players
AC Vila Meã players
S.C. Espinho players
C.D. Aves players
F.C. Paços de Ferreira players
Segunda División players
CD Lugo players
Süper Lig players
İstanbul Başakşehir F.K. players
Austrian Football Bundesliga players
Wolfsberger AC players
Belgian Pro League players
S.K. Beveren players
Portuguese expatriate footballers
Expatriate footballers in Spain
Expatriate footballers in Turkey
Expatriate footballers in Austria
Expatriate footballers in Belgium
Portuguese expatriate sportspeople in Spain
Portuguese expatriate sportspeople in Turkey
Portuguese expatriate sportspeople in Austria
Portuguese expatriate sportspeople in Belgium